The East Side in Kansas City, Missouri encompasses the largest area of the urban core neighborhoods, and is traditionally divided into its own individual neighborhoods and districts. It is adjacent to the Northeast on the North, East Bottoms on its East, Downtown, Midtown, Westport and the Plaza on its West, and Swope Park on its South.

The East Side is also one of the oldest parts of the city, and was once one of the densest parts of the city. Most of the houses in the region predate World War II. The region is in the Kansas City, Missouri School District.

Demographics 
The following approximation is based on United States Census information from 2000 covering the geographical are defined above.
 Population: 47,000-50,000
 Total residential units: 27,000
 Occupied residential units: 23,000
 Total Area: Approximately

See also
List of neighborhoods in Kansas City, Missouri
Map: 

Neighborhoods in Kansas City, Missouri